Matthew Patrick (born 10 October 2000) is a Trinidadian cricketer. He made his List A debut for the West Indies Under-19s in the 2016–17 Regional Super50 on 25 January 2017. In November 2019, he was named in the West Indies' squad for the 2020 Under-19 Cricket World Cup.

References

External links
 

2000 births
Living people
West Indies under-19 cricketers
Place of birth missing (living people)